Felipe Sang Simas (born 26 January 1993) is a Brazilian actor.

Career 
Simas made his debut on television on the 2013 telenovela Flor do Caribe. In 2015, he was cast as one of the protagonist of the telenovela Totalmente Demais, playing the role of Jonatas.

Personal life 
On 14 April 2014, Simas' first son, Joaquim, with and her then girlfriend Mariana Uhlmann. On 3 April 2016, Simas and Uhlmann got married in Itaipava.
In 2017, they had a daughter Maria and in 2020,they had a third child, a boy named Vicente.

Filmography

Television

Film

Awards and nominations

References 

1993 births
Living people
21st-century Brazilian male actors
Brazilian male film actors
Brazilian male telenovela actors
Brazilian male television actors
Male actors from Rio de Janeiro (city)